Jari Olavi Isometsä (born 11 September 1968) is a Finnish former cross-country skier who competed from 1990 to 2006. He won three bronze medals in the 4 × 10 km relay at the Winter Olympics (1992, 1994, 1998).

Isometsä also won four medals at the FIS Nordic World Ski Championships with two silvers (4 × 10 km: 1995, 1997) and two bronzes (4 × 10 km: 1991, 10 km + 15 km combined pursuit: 1995). In the World Cup, he took four victories in races between 10 km and 30 km.

Isometsä was among the six Finnish skiers who were caught of doping in the Finnish 2001 FIS Nordic World Ski Championships scandal for taking hydroxyethyl starch (HES), a blood plasma expander usually used to cover up the use of erythropoietin (EPO) in athletes. He was stripped of his silver medal in the 10 km + 10 km combined pursuit and served a two-year suspension from the FIS, IOC, and World Anti-Doping Agency (WADA), effectively ending his career as a world-class skier.

In 2013, Isometsä received a six-month suspended sentence after the Helsinki District Court found that he had committed perjury when witnessing to the court in 2011 that he was unaware of any doping use in the 1990s.

Cross-country skiing results
All results are sourced from the International Ski Federation (FIS).

Olympic Games
 3 medals – (3 bronze)

World Championships
 4 medals – (2 silver, 2 bronze)

World Cup

Season standings

Individual podiums
 4 victories 
 23 podiums

Team podiums
 7 victories – (7 ) 
 21 podiums – (19 , 2 ) 

Note:  Until the 1999 World Championships and the 1994 Olympics, World Championship and Olympic races were included in the World Cup scoring system.

References

External links
 
 
 

1968 births
Living people
People from Tornio
Finnish male cross-country skiers
Doping cases in cross-country skiing
Cross-country skiers at the 1992 Winter Olympics
Cross-country skiers at the 1994 Winter Olympics
Cross-country skiers at the 1998 Winter Olympics
Olympic cross-country skiers of Finland
Finnish sportspeople in doping cases
Olympic medalists in cross-country skiing
FIS Nordic World Ski Championships medalists in cross-country skiing
Medalists at the 1998 Winter Olympics
Medalists at the 1994 Winter Olympics
Medalists at the 1992 Winter Olympics
Olympic bronze medalists for Finland
Sportspeople from Lapland (Finland)
20th-century Finnish people